Dangerous Guests is a 1949 West German comedy film directed by Géza von Cziffra and starring Wolf Albach-Retty, Vera Molnar and Paul Kemp.

It was made at the Wandsbek Studios of the Hamburg-based Real Film. The film's sets were designed by the art director Mathias Matthies. It was remade by von Cziffra in 1960 as the Austrian film Crime Tango.

Main cast
 Wolf Albach-Retty as Peter Anders
 Vera Molnar as Inge Strohmayer
 Paul Kemp as Amadeus Strohmayer
 Käthe Haack as Tante Agathe
 Alice Treff as Frau Schleinitz
 Gisela Griffel as Lilo
 Ingeborg Körner as Fräulein Schleinitz
 Gustl Busch as Frau Wolf
 Albert Florath as Leopold Anders
 Hans Schwarz Jr. as Boxer-Franz
 Bobby Todd as Taschen-August
 Ludwig Röger as Tango-Poldi
 Hans Leibelt as Direktor Schleinitz
 Franz Schafheitlin as Dr. Roeder
 Carl Voscherau as Bauer Rieder
 Horst von Otto as Herr Spuller
 Kurt Meister as Gutsverwalter Gruber

References

Bibliography 
 Hans-Michael Bock and Tim Bergfelder. The Concise Cinegraph: An Encyclopedia of German Cinema. Berghahn Books, 2009.

External links 
 

1949 films
1940s crime comedy films
West German films
1940s German-language films
Films directed by Géza von Cziffra
German crime comedy films
Films shot at Wandsbek Studios
German black-and-white films
1949 comedy films
1940s German films